Arnold Morley (18 February 1849 – 16 January 1916) was a British barrister and Liberal politician.

Background
Morley was a younger son of Samuel Morley and Rebekah Maria, daughter of Samuel Hope of Liverpool. Lord Hollenden was his elder brother.

Political career
Morley was elected Member of Parliament for Nottingham at a by-election in 1880, and held the seat until the constituency was divided for the 1885 general election. He was then elected as MP for the new Nottingham East constituency, and held that seat until his defeat at the 1895 general election. He served under William Ewart Gladstone as Parliamentary Secretary to the Treasury (chief government whip) between February and July 1886, and was then chief Liberal whip from 1886 to 1892 during the party's stay in opposition. When the Liberals returned to power under Gladstone in August 1892, Morley was sworn of the Privy Council and appointed Postmaster General, with a seat in the cabinet. He retained this post until 1895, the last year under the premiership of the Earl of Rosebery.

Personal life
Morley died unmarried in January 1916, aged 66.

References

External links 
 

1849 births
1916 deaths
Liberal Party (UK) MPs for English constituencies
Members of the Privy Council of the United Kingdom
UK MPs 1880–1885
UK MPs 1885–1886
UK MPs 1886–1892
UK MPs 1892–1895